Nutraloaf (also known as meal loaf, prison loaf, disciplinary loaf, food loaf, lockup loaf, confinement loaf, seg loaf, grue or special management meal) is food served in prisons in the United States and formerly in Canada to inmates who have misbehaved, for example by assaulting prison guards or fellow prisoners. It is similar to meatloaf in texture, but has a wider variety of ingredients. Prison loaf is usually bland, perhaps even unpleasant, but prison wardens argue that nutraloaf provides enough nutrition to keep prisoners healthy without requiring eating utensils.

Preparation
There are many recipes that include a range of food, from vegetables, fruit, meat, and bread or other grains. The ingredients are blended and baked into a solid loaf. In one version, it is made from a mixture of ingredients that include ground beef, vegetables, beans, and bread crumbs. Other versions include mechanically separated poultry and "dairy blend".

Legal challenges

Although nutraloaf can be found in many United States prison facilities, its use is controversial. It was mentioned by the U.S. Supreme Court in 1978 in Hutto v. Finney while ruling that conditions in the Arkansas penal system constituted cruel and unusual punishment. Prisoners were fed "", described as "a substance created by mashing meat, potatoes, oleo [margarine], syrup, vegetables, eggs, and seasoning into a paste and baking the mixture in a pan". The majority opinion delivered by Justice John Paul Stevens upheld an opinion from the 8th Circuit Court that the  diet be discontinued.

The standards of the American Correctional Association, which accredits prisons, discourage the use of food as a disciplinary measure, but adherence to the organization's food standards is voluntary. Denying inmates food as punishment has been found to be unconstitutional by the courts, but because the loaf is generally nutritionally complete, it is sometimes justified as a "dietary adjustment" rather than a denial of proper meals.

Lawsuits regarding nutraloaf have taken place in Illinois, Maryland, Nebraska, New York, Pennsylvania, Washington, and West Virginia. In March 2008, prisoners brought a case before the Vermont Supreme Court, arguing that since Vermont state law does not allow food to be used as punishment, nutraloaf must be removed from the menu. The Vermont Supreme Court held that the nutraloaf and water diet constitutes punishment as it was designed to be unappetizing and as such compelled its removal. In April 2010, sheriff Joe Arpaio of Maricopa County, Arizona won a federal judgment in favor of the constitutionality of nutraloaf. In December 2015, New York State decided to discontinue the use of nutraloaf throughout prisons statewide. In Gordon v. Barnett, the District Court for the Western District of Washington ruled that although it was not cruel and unusual, nutraloaf is a punishment and that prisoners are entitled to a due process hearing before being subjected to it.

See also

Gruel
Hardtack, hard bread of military and naval use
Horsebread, a European bread eaten by the poor
Humanitarian daily ration
Kongbap, a staple in Korean prisons, various mixtures of rice, grains, peas, and beans
 Pemmican
 List of diets

References

External links
 Chicago magazine dining critic tries Nutraloaf, September 2010
 Clark County jail's recipe
  Contains a recipe for "the Loaf".
 Cohen, Adam. "Can Food Be Cruel and Unusual Punishment?" TIME. April 2, 2012.
 Greenwood, Arin. "Taste-Testing Nutraloaf." Slate. Tuesday June 24, 2008.
 "Arkansas Department of Correction's recipe for disciplinary meatloaf " (Archive). Arkansas Times. February 25, 2016. 
 Fuchs, Erin. "NUTRALOAF: This Revolting Food Is Used As Punishment In Prison." Business Insider. June 25, 2013.
The Food So Bad That It's Banned In Prison Half As Interesting. January 7, 2021
Breads
Penal system in the United States
Penal system in Canada

Prison food